{{Infobox legislature
 | name               = National Parliament of Papua New Guinea
 | native_name        = 
 | native_name_lang   = 
 | transcription_name = 
 | legislature        = 11th Parliament 
 | coa_pic            = Logo of the National Parliament of Papua New Guinea.png
 | coa_res            = 173px 
 | coa_alt            =
 | foundation         = 1964
 | house_type         = Unicameral 
 | body               = 
 | houses             =

 | leader1_type       = Monarch
 | leader1            = Charles III
 | party1             = 
 | election1          = 9 September 2022

 | leader2_type       = Governor-General
 | leader2            = Bob Dadae
 | party2             = 
 | election2          = 28 February 2017

 | leader3_type       = Speaker
 | leader3            = Job Pomat
 | party3             =  
 | election3          = 2 August 2017

 | leader4_type       = Prime Minister
 | leader4            = James Marape
 | party4             = Pangu
 | election4          = 30 May 2019

 | leader5_type       = Leader of the Opposition
 | leader5            = Joseph Lelang
 | party5             = PNC
 | election5          = 12 August 2022

 | members            = 118 (96 open electorates and 22 provincial electorates)
 | house1             = 
 | house2             = 
 | structure1         = National Parliament of Papua New Guinea - 11th Term.svg
 | structure1_res     = 250px 
 | structure1_alt     = 
 | structure2         = 
 | structure2_res     = 
 | structure2_alt     = 
 | political_groups1  = Government (102)
 Pangu Pati (42)
 United Resources (12)
 Independents (8)
 National Alliance (4)
 People's Party (4)
 Social Democratic (4)
 People's First (4)
 PNG Party (3)
 United Labour (3)
 Advance PNG (2)
 Liberal Party (2)
 National Party (3)
 Allegiance Party (1)
 Green Party (1)

 New Generation (1)
 Our Development (1)
 People's Labour (1)
 PMC Party (1)
 PNC Party (1)
 People's Progress (1)
 People's Reform (1)
 Destiny Party (1)
 THE Party (1)

Opposition (16)
 PNC Party (13)

Other (2)
 Vacant Seats (3) 
 | political_groups2  = 5
 | committees1        = 
 | committees2        = 
 | joint_committees   = 
 | voting_system1     = Limited instant-runoff voting
 | voting_system2     = 
 | last_election1     = 9 – 22 July 2022
 | last_election2     = 
 | previous_election1 =
 | previous_election2 =
 | session_room       = Papua New Guinea 1991-039 Parliament House, Port Moresby (33351725760).jpg
 | session_res        = 250px
 | session_alt        = 
 | meeting_place      = National Parliament House, Port Moresby
 | website            = 
 | footnotes          = 
 | motto              = 
|background_color=green|term_limits=5 years|next_election1=2027}}

The National Parliament of Papua New Guinea''' is the unicameral national legislature in Papua New Guinea. It was created in 1964 as the House of Assembly of Papua and New Guinea but gained its current name after the nation was granted independence in 1975.

The 111 members of parliament serve five-year terms, 89 of whom are chosen from single-member "open" electorates, which are sometimes referred to as "seats" but are officially known as constituencies. The remaining 22 are chosen from single-member provincial electorates: the 20 provinces, the autonomous province of Bougainville (North Solomons), and the National Capital District. Each provincial member becomes governor of their province unless they take a ministerial position, in which case the governorship passes to an open member of the province.

From 1964 until 1977 an Optional Preferential Voting System was used. The first past the post system was used from 1977 until 2002. Electoral reforms introduced by former Prime Minister Mekere Morauta introduced Limited Preferential Voting, in which voters numbered three preferred candidates. LPV was first used nationally in the 2007 election.

As in other Commonwealth realms, the party or coalition with the most seats in the parliament is invited by the Governor-General to form a government, and its leader subsequently becomes Prime Minister of Papua New Guinea. The Prime Minister then appoints his cabinet from fellow parliament members. Members of parliament are seated in a similar manner to other Westminster system parliaments, but use chairs instead of benches.

Papua New Guinea has a fractious political culture, and no party in the history of parliament has yet won a majority. Therefore, negotiations between parties have always been necessary to form governments. New governments are protected from votes of no confidence during their first 18 months and during the last 12 months before a national election. More recently, in a move aimed at further minimizing no-confidence motions, then-Prime Minister Mekere Morauta introduced changes that prevented members of the government from voting in favour of such a motion.

All citizens over the age of 18 may vote, although voting is not compulsory.

Latest election

See also
Women in the National Parliament of Papua New Guinea
Elections in Papua New Guinea
Speaker of the National Parliament of Papua New Guinea
Members of the National Parliament of Papua New Guinea, 2002–2007
Members of the National Parliament of Papua New Guinea, 2007–2012
Members of the National Parliament of Papua New Guinea, 2012–2017
Members of the National Parliament of Papua New Guinea, 2017–2022
Members of the National Parliament of Papua New Guinea, 2022–2027
List of legislatures by country
Politics of Papua New Guinea

References

External links

 
1975 establishments in Papua New Guinea
Papua New Guinea
Papua New Guinea
Political organisations based in Papua New Guinea
Politics of Papua New Guinea
Papua New Guinea
Westminster system